Mikael Thorstensson (born January 24, 1985, in Sollentuna) is a retired Swedish football player and current coach. He currently manages his hometown team Sollentuna United FF in the Swedish Division 2.

Before the beginning of the 2009 season, Mikael was signed by AIK from the club's feeder club Väsby United. His debut for the first team came in the first game of the season when he came on as a substitute against Halmstad BK. During his stay in AIK he struggled with injuries. However, with his 12 appearances, he took part in the champion winning squad.

Mikael has already been with AIK, six years ago when he was a part of one of AIK's youth squads.

In January 2010, Mikael signed a two-year deal with Södertälje side Assyriska. In December 2012, he retired from football at the relatively early age of 27.

Honours

AIK 
 Allsvenskan: 2009
 Svenska Cupen: 2009

External links
 
 

1985 births
Living people
Swedish footballers
AFC Eskilstuna players
AIK Fotboll players
Assyriska FF players
Allsvenskan players
Superettan players
Swedish football managers
Association football forwards
People from Sollentuna Municipality
Sportspeople from Stockholm County